Michael Latta (born May 25, 1991) is a Canadian professional ice hockey centre who is currently an unrestricted free agent. He most recently played for Färjestad BK of the Swedish Hockey League (SHL). Latta was selected by the Nashville Predators in the third round, 72nd overall, at the 2009 NHL Entry Draft.

Playing career

Junior
Prior to turning professional, Latta played major junior hockey in the Ontario Hockey League (OHL) with the Ottawa 67's and Guelph Storm. He was drafted by the Nashville Predators on June 26, 2009, at the 2009 NHL Entry Draft, 72nd overall.

Professional
After playing one more season in the OHL after being drafted, on April 14, 2010, Nashville signed Latta to a three-year, entry-level contract. He played three seasons with the Predators' American Hockey League (AHL) affiliate, the Milwaukee Admirals.

During the 2012–13 season, on April 3, 2013, at the NHL trade deadline, Latta was traded to the Washington Capitals, along with Martin Erat, in exchange for prospect Filip Forsberg.

Latta made his NHL debut with the Capitals in the 2013–14 season. He scored his first career NHL goal on November 15, 2013, against the Detroit Red Wings.

On July 1, 2016, after not being retained by the Capitals, Latta signed a one-year deal as a free agent with the Los Angeles Kings. After competing in training camp and pre-season with the Kings, Latta was reassigned to begin the 2016–17 season with AHL affiliate, the Ontario Reign. Latta featured in 29 games with the Reign for 6 points before he was traded without making an appearance for the Kings to the Chicago Blackhawks, in exchange for Cameron Schilling on January 21, 2017. Latta played out the season with the Blackhawks AHL affiliate, the Rockford IceHogs, regaining his scoring touch in contributing with 16 points in 32 games.

As a restricted free agent, Latta was not extended a qualifying offer by the Blackhawks releasing him to free agency on June 26, 2017. On July 4, 2017, Latta signed a one-year, two-way contract with the Arizona Coyotes. On December 14, the Coyotes traded Latta to the New Jersey Devils in exchange for Ryan Kujawinski.

On July 18, 2018, having left the Devils as a free agent, Latta signed a one-year contract with Chinese club, Kunlun Red Star of the Kontinental Hockey League (KHL).

Having left the KHL at the conclusion of his contract, Latta remained a free agent to start the 2019–20 season. On November 14, 2019, Latta agreed to join Swedish outfit, Färjestad BK of the SHL, on a one-year contract.

Personal life
Latta is the cousin of Winnipeg Jets defenceman Logan Stanley.

Career statistics

References

External links

1991 births
Binghamton Devils players
Canadian expatriate ice hockey players in China
Canadian expatriate ice hockey players in Sweden
Canadian ice hockey centres
Färjestad BK players
Guelph Storm players
HC Kunlun Red Star players
Hershey Bears players
Ice hockey people from Ontario
Living people
Milwaukee Admirals players
Nashville Predators draft picks
Ontario Reign (AHL) players
Ottawa 67's players
People from the Regional Municipality of Waterloo
Rockford IceHogs (AHL) players
Tucson Roadrunners players
Washington Capitals players
Canadian expatriate ice hockey players in the United States
Canadian expatriate ice hockey players in Austria
Canadian expatriate ice hockey players in the Czech Republic